Richard Bremridge (1803 – 15 June 1878) was a British Conservative politician.

Bremridge was first elected MP for Barnstaple in 1847. He was re-elected in 1852, but this vote was overturned in 1853 due to bribery, and the writ for the seat was suspended. He then became MP again in 1864, after a by-election in 1863 was overturned, but did not stand for re-election at the next election in 1865.

References

External links
 

UK MPs 1859–1865
1803 births
1878 deaths
Conservative Party (UK) MPs for English constituencies
UK MPs 1847–1852
UK MPs 1852–1857
Members of the Parliament of the United Kingdom for Barnstaple